Khlong San is a khwaeng (subdistrict) of Khlong San District on Bangkok's Thonburi side. It is the location of the district office.

History
The district is named after Khlong San, a natural khlong ('canal'). 

This area was the home of many of the Bunnag nobles. It was a stop for overseas cargo ships in Bangkok, as Bangkok Port was not yet built.

Originally, Khlong San District was called Bang Lamphu Lang, until 1916 during the King Vajiravudh's reign, when it was part of Thonburi Province. Its status was changed to king amphoe ('minor district') in 1938 and back to amphoe (district) again in 1957 due to population changes. It became part of Bangkok after the merging of Thonburi and Phra Nakhon Provinces in 1971.

The intersection of Charoen Nakhon and Charoen Rat Roads (Chanroen Rat junction), used to be the location of Pak Khlong San railway station, the terminus of the Maeklong railway line since 1904. In 1961, when Bangkok was expanding, the government demolished the station and tracks to create Charoen Rat Road.

Geography
Khlong San has an area of  6.87 km2 (2.65 mi2), regarded as the middle part of the district.

Neighbouring subdistricts are (from the north clockwise): Somdet Chao Phraya in its district, Chakkrawat, and Talat Noi of Samphanthawong District (across the Chao Phraya River), Khlong Ton Sai in its district, and Hiran Ruchi of Thon Buri District.

Places

Wanglee House, Lhong 1919, and  Mazu Shrine
ICONSIAM
Somdet Chaopraya Institute of Psychiatry

References

Khlong San district
Subdistricts of Bangkok
Populated places on the Chao Phraya River